Jane Veitch is a television news and weather presenter for ITV Breakfast regional news strand, Daybreak Northern Ireland.

Jane is originally from County Fermanagh. She began her career as a documentary producer. Jane has a degree from Trinity College in Dublin and completed her journalism studies at Belfast Metropolitan College. She currently works as a presenter for Macmillan Media Belfast.

References

External links

Year of birth missing (living people)
Living people
People from County Fermanagh
Television presenters from Northern Ireland